Epeli Ruivadra (born 1 June 1977 in Nausori) is a Fijian rugby union footballer.  He plays as a centre.

He is 1.85m tall and weighs 90 kg. He started playing rugby at Lelean Memorial School and represented the school's Under 19s team in the Deans Trophy in 1997. He even tried to play at prop for his club Dravo before moving to the backs.

He trialled in 2001 for the Pacific Tri-Nations and he managed to break into the squad for the tour to Europe later that year, then made the Fiji sevens squad for Beijing and Hong Kong in 2002 where he was Fiji's top try-scorer at both tournaments.

Ruivadra made his Test debut under Mac McCallion in the first game against Tonga in June 2002, and scored a try.

He earned a spot in the Rugby World Cup 2003 and played an instrumental role in Fiji's final pool game against Scotland but they were unlucky to lose.

External links
 Profile of Epeli Ruivadra

1977 births
Living people
People from Nausori
Fijian rugby union players
Rugby union centres
Fiji international rugby union players
Male rugby sevens players
Fiji international rugby sevens players
I-Taukei Fijian people
People educated at Lelean Memorial School
Commonwealth Games medallists in rugby sevens
Commonwealth Games silver medallists for Fiji
Commonwealth Games rugby sevens players of Fiji
Rugby sevens players at the 2002 Commonwealth Games
Medallists at the 2002 Commonwealth Games